Edward Smith-Stanley may refer to:
 Edward Smith-Stanley, 12th Earl of Derby (1752–1834), English politician
 Edward Smith-Stanley, 13th Earl of Derby (1775–1851), English politician and son of the above
 Edward Smith-Stanley, 14th Earl of Derby (1799–1869), son of the above, Prime Minister of the United Kingdom

See also 
 Edward Stanley (disambiguation)
 Earl of Derby